Andreas Schaad (born 18 April 1965) is a former Swiss Nordic combined skier who competed during the late 1980s and early 1990s. He won two medals in the 3 x 10 km team event at the Winter Olympics with a silver in 1988 and a bronze in 1994. He also won a silver medal in the 3 x 10 km team event at the 1989 FIS Nordic World Ski Championships in Lahti.

External links 
 
 

1965 births
Living people
Swiss male Nordic combined skiers
Olympic Nordic combined skiers of Switzerland
Nordic combined skiers at the 1988 Winter Olympics
Nordic combined skiers at the 1992 Winter Olympics
Nordic combined skiers at the 1994 Winter Olympics
Olympic medalists in Nordic combined
FIS Nordic World Ski Championships medalists in Nordic combined
Medalists at the 1988 Winter Olympics
Medalists at the 1994 Winter Olympics
Olympic silver medalists for Switzerland
Olympic bronze medalists for Switzerland